Nikolaos Nakas (born 13 April 1982) is a German former football defender of Greek heritage.

References

External links
 Nikolaos Nakas at worldfootball.net 
 

1982 births
Living people
German footballers
VfB Stuttgart II players
SV Darmstadt 98 players
SV Wehen Wiesbaden players
SV Elversberg players
German people of Greek descent
2. Bundesliga players
Association football defenders
People from Ludwigsburg
Sportspeople from Stuttgart (region)
Footballers from Baden-Württemberg